The Islamic Azad University, Garmsar Branch is a branch of Iran's Islamic Azad Universities. It is situated in the city of Garmsar 82 kilometers southeast of Tehran.

History
This university started its work with two majors (veterinary and arabic literature) in 1988. It was then situated in Garmsar's university street. Since then, the university has grown both in quantity and quality. At present, it has 204 faculty members, and about 13,000 students in B.S. and M.S. and D.V.M of 85 majors. It is the biggest university in the area number ten of Azad university branches.

See also
Higher education in Iran
List of Iranian Universities
Garmsar

External links
Islamic Azad University - Garmsar Branch Official Web Site

Educational institutions established in 1988
Garmsar|Garmsar
Buildings and structures in Semnan Province
Education in Semnan Province
1988 establishments in Iran